Galaxias is a genus of small freshwater fish in the family Galaxiidae, and are frequently referred to as the galaxiids. These highly adaptable fish are typically found at temperate latitudes across the Southern Hemisphere.

Galaxiids are scaleless and somewhat tubular in body form, ranging from very slender to quite bulky. They are somewhat torpedo-shaped, with the dorsal and anal fins positioned close to the tail.

Species
The 46 recognized species in this genus are:
 Galaxias aequipinnis Raadik, 2014 (East Gippsland Galaxias) 
 Galaxias anomalus Stokell, 1959 (Roundhead Galaxias)
 Galaxias arcanus Raadik, 2014 (Riffle Galaxias) 
 Galaxias argenteus Gmelin, 1789 (Giant Kōkopu)
 Galaxias auratus Johnston, 1883 (Golden Galaxias)
 Galaxias brevipinnis Günther, 1866 (Climbing Galaxias)
 Galaxias brevissimus Raadik, 2014 (Short-tail Galaxias) 
 Galaxias cobitinis McDowall & Waters, 2002 (Lowland Long-jawed Galaxias)
 Galaxias depressiceps McDowall & Wallis, 1996 (Flathead Galaxias)
 Galaxias divergens Stokell, 1959 (Dwarf Galaxias)
 Galaxias eldoni McDowall, 1997 (Eldon's Galaxias)
 Galaxias fasciatus Gray, 1842 (Banded Kōkopu)
 Galaxias fontanus Fulton, 1978 (Swan Galaxias)
 Galaxias fuscus Mack, 1936 (Barred Galaxias) 
 Galaxias globiceps Eigenmann, 1928
 Galaxias gollumoides McDowall & Chadderton, 1999 (Gollum Galaxias) 
 Galaxias gracilis McDowall, 1967 (Dwarf Inanga)
 Galaxias gunaikurnai Raadik, 2014 (Shaw Galaxias) 
 Galaxias johnstoni Scott, 1936 (Clarence Galaxias)
 Galaxias lanceolatus Raadik, 2014 (Tapered Galaxias) 
 Galaxias longifundus Raadik, 2014 (West Gippsland Galaxias) 
 Galaxias macronasus McDowall & Waters, 2003
 Galaxias maculatus Jenyns, 1842 (Common Galaxias)
 Galaxias mcdowalli Raadik, 2014 (McDowall's Galaxias) 
 Galaxias mungadhan Raadik, 2014 (Dargo Galaxias) 
 Galaxias neocaledonicus Weber & de Beaufort, 1913
 Galaxias niger Andrews, 1985 (Black Galaxias)
 Galaxias occidentalis Ogilby, 1899 (Western Galaxias)
 Galaxias olidus Günther, 1866 (Mountain Galaxias) 
 Galaxias oliros Raadik, 2014 (Obscure Galaxias) 
 Galaxias ornatus Castelnau, 1873 (Ornate Galaxias) 
 Galaxias parvus Frankenberg, 1968 (Small Pedder Galaxias)
 Galaxias paucispondylus Stokell, 1938 (Alpine Galaxias)
 Galaxias pedderensis Frankenberg, 1968 (Pedder Galaxias)
 Galaxias platei Steindachner, 1898
 Galaxias postvectis F. E. Clarke, 1899 (Short-jaw Kōkopu)
 Galaxias prognathus Stokell, 1940 (Long-jaw Galaxias)
 Galaxias pullus McDowall, 1997 (Dusky Galaxias)
 Galaxias rostratus Klunzinger, 1872 (Flathead Galaxias)
 Galaxias supremus Raadik, 2014 (Kosciuszko Galaxias) 
 Galaxias tantangara Raadik, 2014 (Stocky Galaxias) 
 Galaxias tanycephalus Fulton, 1978 (Saddled Galaxias)
 Galaxias terenasus Raadik, 2014 (Roundsnout Galaxias) 
 Galaxias truttaceus Valenciennes, 1846 (Spotted Galaxias)
 Galaxias vulgaris Stokell, 1949 (Common River Galaxias)
 Galaxias zebratus Castelnau, 1861 (Cape Galaxias)

Distribution
Galaxiids are restricted to the Southern Hemisphere, and generally only occur in temperate latitudes. Only one species is known from subtropical habitats.

Galaxiids are the dominant group of native freshwater fish in New Zealand, and, along with the Percichthyidae, one of two dominant groups of native freshwater fish in southeastern Australia. Only one of the species (G. zebratus) is found in Africa, and only three (G. globiceps, G. maculatus, and G. platei) are found in South America.

Habitat
Galaxiids are coolwater species, with many wholly freshwater species specialising in high-altitude upland streams (including very small streams), rivers, and lakes.  Some galaxiids include a marine stage in their lifecycles where larvae are washed out to sea to develop, and return to rivers as juveniles. This type of diadromous fish migration is known as amphidromy. These species are consequently also found in low-altitude habitats, but frequently migrate to high-altitude reaches of river systems in their adult stage.

Threats
Wholly freshwater galaxiids are gravely threatened by exotic salmonid species, particularly exotic trout species, which prey heavily upon them and compete with them for food and habitat. This is a major concern, as exotic trout species have been introduced to many different land masses (e.g. Australia, New Zealand, South Africa) with no thought as to impacts on native fish such as galaxiids, and no attempt to preserve some exotic trout-free habitats for native fish.

In most situations, wholly freshwater galaxiids are unable to persist in the presence of exotic trout species, and many are now restricted to the few remaining trout-free habitats. Where these species are found in the presence of trout, the galaxiids usually consist entirely of individuals which dispersed there from an upstream trout-free population, and are not self-sustaining. Numerous localised extinctions of wholly freshwater galaxiid species (i.e. mountain galaxias) have been caused by the introduction of exotic trout species (including ongoing illegal stockings) and a number of wholly freshwater galaxiid species are threatened with extinction by exotic trout species and other exotic salmonids.

Introduced salmoniids also have a negative impact on diadromous galaxiids, competing with them for food and habitat, as well as preying on them. However, the impact is not as great and they appear to be able to persist in the presence of trout.

References

External links
 Video of Barred Galaxias in the Central Highlands, Victoria, Australia
 Video of Climbing Galaxias in Wilsons Promontory National Park, Australia
 Video of Climbing Galaxias on Flinders Island, Tasmania, Australia
 Video of Common Galaxias in Croajingolong National Park, Australia
  Video of Dargo Galaxias in the Alpine National Park, Australia
 Video of Mountain Galaxias in the Grampians National Park, Victoria, Australia
 Video of Obscure Galaxias in the Grampians National Park, Victoria, Australia
 Video of Ornate Galaxias in the Yarra River catchment, Victoria, Australia
 Video of Spotted Galaxias in Wilsons Promontory National Park, Australia
 Video of Spotted Galaxias from Waratah Bay, Australia

 
Taxa named by Georges Cuvier
Freshwater fish genera